The Calgary Flames are a professional ice hockey team based in Calgary, Alberta, Canada. The team is a member of the Pacific Division in the Western Conference of the National Hockey League (NHL).  The Flames arrived in Calgary in 1980 after transferring from the city of Atlanta, Georgia, where they were known as the Atlanta Flames from their founding in 1972 until relocation.

There have been six general managers in Flames' history.  The first was Cliff Fletcher, who left his position as the assistant general manager of the St. Louis Blues to become the first general manager of the Atlanta Flames in 1972.  Fletcher remained with the Flames through their transfer to Calgary, ultimately holding the position for 19 years until he left to become the president and general manager of the Toronto Maple Leafs in 1991.  Fletcher built a team that twice won the Presidents' Trophy as the top performer in the regular season, and won the Stanley Cup in 1989.  Fletcher earned the nickname "Trader Cliff" for his willingness to make high-profile deals.  He is best remembered for his trades that brought Alberta native Lanny McDonald to Calgary from the Colorado Rockies in 1981, and the acquisition of Doug Gilmour as part of a seven-player deal in 1988. Fletcher was inducted into the Hockey Hall of Fame as a builder in 2004.

Doug Risebrough succeeded Fletcher in 1991 and quickly completed a ten-player deal, the largest in NHL history, with Fletcher's Leafs.  The deal sent Gilmour and four players to Toronto, while former 50-goal scorer Gary Leeman came to Calgary with four others.  The trade transformed both teams; the Leafs quickly developed into playoff contenders, while Leeman scored only 11 goals in a Flames uniform.  Risebrough remained the Flames' general manager until 1995.

Al Coates was named the third general manager in team history in 1995.  He held the position for five seasons, during which the Flames qualified for the playoffs only once.  Craig Button replaced Coates in 2000, and in three years as general manager failed to qualify for the playoffs.  Button was fired following the 2002–03 season and replaced with Darryl Sutter, who was serving as the team's head coach.

In his first year as general manager, Sutter led the Flames to their first playoff appearance in eight seasons in 2003–04.  The team also won its first playoff series in 15 years, defeating three division winners en route to a surprise appearance in the 2004 Stanley Cup Finals. Sutter led the Flames for eight seasons before stepping down in December 2010.  He was replaced with Jay Feaster. Jay Feaster was let go on December 12, 2013 and was succeeded by Brad Treliving who was hired on April 28, 2014

General Managers

References

Notes

 
Calgary Flames general managers
general managers